Knud Karl Krogh-Tonning (December 31, 1842 – February 19, 1911) was a Norwegian theologian, known for his conversion to Catholicism.

Biography
He was born at Stathelle, in the south of Norway, and graduated in 1861. He was manager of Læreskolen in Balestrand, and then in 1873 became Vicar of Årdal. After a number of other appointments he became pastor in Old Aker Church from 1886 to 1900. In autumn 1899 he applied to leave his position for reasons of conscience, and in 1900 he made public his conversion to Catholicism. His autobiographical En Konvertits Erindringer was published in 1906. He died at Kristiania, now Oslo, in 1911.

Works
His works include:
Kirkelige vidnesbyrd om absolutionen, 1881
Om den ældste kirkelig apologi overfor det græsk-romerske hedenskabs tænkning, doctorate thesis, 1883
Den Christelige dogmatik: Fundamentallære, 1885
Christelig Opdragelselære, 1887
Die Gnadenlehre und die Stille Reformation, 1894
De Gratia Christi et de Libero Arbitrio Sancti Thomae Aquinatis, J. Dybwad, 1898
En Konvertits Erindringer, 1906
Katholisches Christentum, 1906
Die heilige Birgitta von Schweden, 1907

Translated into English
Catholic Christianity and the Modern World; a Course of Sermons, B. Herder, 1916.

See also
John Henry Newman

References

External links
 Nordisk Familjebok: Krogh-Tonning, Knud Karl, 1904–1926.
 Om Knud Karl Krogh-Tonning: Salmonsens Konversationsleksikon

Norwegian Lutheran theologians
Norwegian Roman Catholic theologians
Converts to Roman Catholicism from Lutheranism
Norwegian priests
Norwegian non-fiction writers
1842 births
1911 deaths